Scott Gregory Hazelton (born December 19, 1973) is an American football coach. He is the defensive coordinator at Michigan State University. Hazelton was the defensive coordinator and linebackers coach at Kansas State University in 2019 before moving to Michigan State. He was previously the defensive coordinator and linebackers coach at the University of Wyoming in 2017 and 2018 where he led nationally ranked defenses in both seasons, linebackers coach at USC in 2012 and the defensive coordinator of the 2011 FCS National Champions, North Dakota State Bison. Hazelton was tutored as a defensive coach under the guidance of then North Dakota State head coach and current Buffalo Bills assistant Bob Babich and Gus Bradley who is a former head coach of the Jacksonville Jaguars, former Bison assistant coach, and is currently the defensive coordinator for the Los Angeles Chargers.

Playing career
Hazelton prepped at Horizon High School in Thornton, Colorado from 1989 to 1991.

After high school, Hazelton played linebacker at Fort Lewis College, lettering for three years (1992–1994) and earning a degree in exercise science.

Coaching career
Hazelton coaching career started as a defensive backs coach and interim defensive coordinator for his alma mater, Fort Lewis. In 2000, Hazelton became a grad assistant at North Dakota State where he worked closely with Bradley and held that position until after the 2001 season.

After finishing his graduate program, Hazelton moved to St. Olaf College, where he worked as the Oles defensive backs coach for two seasons.

In 2004, Hazelton was offered the defensive coordinator position at Missouri Southern State and held it for two years before becoming the linebackers coach at Michigan Tech in 2006.

North Dakota State
After five years of coaching elsewhere, Hazelton returned to North Dakota State as a defensive line coach in 2007. In his first year back with the Bison he helped the defense rank 18th nationally in third down efficiency (33.3%) and 22nd nationally in rushing defense (126.5 ypg). This was all highlighted with wins over FBS opponents Central Michigan 44–14 and Minnesota 27–21.

A year later the defense led the FCS in pass defense (116.82 ypg), 5th in total defense (254 ypg) and 19th in scoring defense (19.18 ppg). In regards to his position his players ranked 3rd nationally in sacks (3.36 sacks per game) and 5th in tackles for a loss (8.55 TFL per game).

2009 was not a good year for the Bison and Hazelton. The defense forced just three interceptions while ranking 90th in scoring defense and finished 3–8 (2–6).

In 2010, Hazelton was promoted to defensive coordinator. His defensive unit greatly improved from 2009 as the Bison ranked 7th nationally in scoring defense (18.21 ppg) and turnover margin (+1.07 avg). As well the defense ranked 15th in pass efficiency and 19th in sacks.

The Bison advanced to the NCAA Football Championship Subdivision (FCS) playoffs in 2010 for the first time in school history during Hazelton's inaugural season as defensive coordinator which included a win over Big 12 member Kansas 6–3. In their game against the Jayhawks Hazelton's defense forced 3 turnovers and held them to under 300 yards.

2011 was a banner year for Hazelton and the Bison as they went on to win the FCS National Championship 17–6 over Sam Houston along with finishing the year with a 14–1 (7–1) record. During the playoffs the Bison rode their defense as they gave up just 27 points in four games. The Bison ranked in the top 20 in six different categories including 1st nationally in points allowed (12.73 ppg) and tied for seventh in takeaways with 31 in 15 games. For the second time in four years Hazelton and the Bison beat Big 10 member Minnesota 37–24.

USC
On February 12, 2012 Hazelton was hired as the linebackers coach of the USC Trojans under head coach Lane Kiffin. Hazelton replaced Joe Barry who became the linebackers coach for the San Diego Chargers on February 6, 2012.

Nevada
After just one season and less than a year with USC, Hazelton was hired by University of Nevada Wolf Pack head coach Brian Polian on January 18, 2013 to become the team's defensive coordinator.

Jacksonville Jaguars
From 2014 to 2016, Hazelton was an assistant linebackers coach for the Jacksonville Jaguars under head coach Gus Bradley.

Wyoming
On January 10, 2017, Hazelton was reunited with Craig Bohl when he was hired as the defensive coordinator for the Wyoming Cowboys In his first season, the Wyoming defense was 1st in the nation in takeaways, 9th in the nation in scoring defense, and 1st in the Mountain West Conference in sacks. In 2019, the Cowboys again finished in the top-30 in the nation in scoring defense and total defense. 13 defenders earned all-conference honors while Hazelton was their coordinator.

Kansas State
Hazelton was hired by Kansas State and head coach Chris Klieman to be the defensive coordinator. In his one season at Kansas State, his defense ranked 2nd in the Big 12 Conference in scoring defense and 4th in the Big 12 Conference, a marked improvement for the Wildcat defense over 2019.

Michigan State
On February 28, 2020, Hazelton was announced as Michigan State's defensive coordinator in the first season under head coach Mel Tucker.

Personal life
Hazelton is married with four children.

References

External links
 Michigan State profile
 Kansas State profile

Living people
1973 births
American football linebackers
Fort Lewis Skyhawks football coaches
Fort Lewis Skyhawks football players
Jacksonville Jaguars coaches
Kansas State Wildcats football coaches
Michigan State Spartans football coaches
Michigan Tech Huskies football coaches
Nevada Wolf Pack football coaches
North Dakota State Bison football coaches
St. Olaf Oles football coaches
USC Trojans football coaches
Wyoming Cowboys football coaches
People from Brighton, Colorado
People from Thornton, Colorado
Coaches of American football from Colorado
Players of American football from Colorado